Michael R. Lyu, Ph.D., is the Choh-Ming Li Professor of Computer Science and Engineering at the Chinese University of Hong Kong in Shatin, Hong Kong. 
Michael is well known to the software engineering community as the editor of two classic book volumes in software reliability engineering: Software Fault Tolerance and the Handbook of Software Reliability Engineering. Both books have also been translated into Chinese and published in China. He was also named in The AI 2000 Most Influential Scholars Annual List with three appearances.

References 

Living people
Chinese software engineers
Academic staff of the Chinese University of Hong Kong
Chinese computer scientists
Year of birth missing (living people)